Saint Joseph is an unincorporated place in Portage County, Ohio, United States. It is located along Waterloo Road on the western edge of Randolph Township near its border with Suffield. The area is named after the Roman Catholic Parish of St. Joseph, established in 1831. In addition to the church building, which dates to 1904, the parish also includes a clergy house, elementary school for grades preschool through eighth, daycare center, cemetery, grotto, and food bank. A post office was located in the community from 1893 to 1904.

References

Unincorporated communities in Portage County, Ohio
Populated places established in 1831
Unincorporated communities in Ohio